Sharp Objects is a 2018 American psychological thriller television miniseries based on Gillian Flynn's 2006 debut novel of the same name that premiered on July 8, 2018, on HBO. The series was created by Marti Noxon, directed by Jean-Marc Vallée, and stars Amy Adams, Patricia Clarkson, Chris Messina, Eliza Scanlen, Matt Craven, Henry Czerny, Taylor John Smith, Madison Davenport, Miguel Sandoval, Will Chase, Jackson Hurst, Sophia Lillis, Lulu Wilson, and Elizabeth Perkins. It follows Camille Preaker, an emotionally troubled reporter who returns to her hometown to cover the murders of two young girls.

The series received critical acclaim, particularly for its visuals, dark atmosphere, directing, and acting (particularly that of Adams, Clarkson, and Scanlen). Among its accolades, Clarkson won the Golden Globe Award for Best Supporting Actress – Series, Miniseries or Television Film and Adams received a nomination for the Golden Globe Award for Best Actress – Miniseries or Television Film. It also received eight nominations at the 71st Primetime Emmy Awards, including Outstanding Limited Series and acting nominations for Adams and Clarkson. It is the final directorial work of Vallée before his death in 2021.

Premise
Crime reporter Camille Preaker, suffering from alcoholism and recently discharged from a psychiatric hospital after years of self-harming, returns to her hometown of Wind Gap, Missouri, to investigate the murders of two young girls. Upon arriving at her childhood home, she finds herself once again under the critical eye of her mother, Adora, a small-town socialite, which forces Camille to confront her personal demons.

Cast and characters

Main
 Amy Adams as Camille Preaker, an alcoholic reporter recently discharged from a psychiatric hospital
 Sophia Lillis as young Camille Preaker
 Patricia Clarkson as Adora Crellin, Camille and Amma's overbearing socialite mother
 Chris Messina as Detective Richard Willis, a detective from Kansas City who arrives in Wind Gap to assist with the ongoing murder investigations
 Eliza Scanlen as Amma Crellin, Camille's half-sister and Adora and Alan's daughter
 Matt Craven as  Bill Vickery, the police chief of Wind Gap
 Henry Czerny as Alan Crellin, Camille's stepfather, Adora's husband, and Amma's father
 Taylor John Smith as John Keene, the brother of Wind Gap's second murder victim, Natalie Keene
 Madison Davenport as Ashley Wheeler, John's girlfriend
 Miguel Sandoval as Frank Curry, the editor of the St. Louis Chronicle who sends Camille back to Wind Gap on the assignment that leads her to confront her "issues"
 Will Chase as Bob Nash, the father of Wind Gap's first murder victim, Ann Nash
 Jackson Hurst as Kirk Lacey, a teacher at Wind Gap Middle School
 Lulu Wilson as Marian Crellin, Camille's half-sister who died in front of her when they were children, Adora and Alan's first child together, and Amma's sister
 Elizabeth Perkins as Jackie O'Neill, the town gossip and longtime family friend of the Crellins

Recurring

 David Sullivan as Chris, the owner of the bar where Camille frequently goes to in Wind Gap and an old friend of hers
 Violet Brinson as Kelsey
 April Brinson as Jodes
 Barbara Eve Harris as Eileen, Frank Curry's wife and friend of Camille
 Emily Yancy as Gayla, Adora's and Alan's housekeeper
 Sydney Sweeney as Alice, Camille's teenage roommate at the psychiatric hospital she was committed to
 Jessica Treska as Natalie Keene
 Beth Broderick as Annie B
 Catherine Carlen as Deeanna
 Loretta Fox as Melissa
 Aaron Holliday as Damon
 London Vanovan as Amanda Nash
 Ryan James Nelson as Nolan
 Jennifer Aspen as Jeannie Keene, the mother of John and Natalie Keene
 Randy Oglesby as Pastor
 Betsy Baker as Jocelyn Vickery
 Cody Sullivan as Nathan
 Evan Castelloe as Teen Kirk Lacey
 Gunnar Koehler as Bobby Nash
 Gracie Prewitt as Tiffanie Nash
 Daisy Garcia as Bar Waitress
 Reagan Pasternak as Katie Lacey
 Lauran September as Angie
 Jean Villepique as Gretchen
 Ericka Kreutz as Lisa
 Guy Boyd as Clyde
 Sonny Shah as Cashier
 Kaegan Baron as Ann Nash

Episodes

Production

Development
In 2008, it was reported that Gillian Flynn's novel Sharp Objects was in development by French production company Pathé with Andrea Arnold set to direct. By 2012, it was reported that the novel had been optioned by Alliance Films with Jason Blum expected to serve as a producer. Subsequently, Marti Noxon approached Blum with her vision for an eight episode television series.

On July 8, 2014, it was announced that Blumhouse Productions and Entertainment One would be developing and producing a drama based on the debut novel from Gillian Flynn. Marti Noxon would serve as the showrunner, writer and executive producer, while Jean-Marc Vallée would serve as the director and executive producer.

On April 1, 2016, it was announced that HBO had given the production an eight episode straight-to-series order. On May 15, 2018, it was announced that the series would premiere on July 8, 2018. On July 25, 2018, HBO president of programming, Casey Bloys, confirmed that, unlike another HBO series, Big Little Lies, which was originally ordered as a limited series before being renewed for a second season, Sharp Objects will not return for more episodes following its limited run.

Casting
On February 19, 2016, Variety reported that Amy Adams had joined the project as its lead. In March 2017, it was announced that Patricia Clarkson, Eliza Scanlen, Elizabeth Perkins, Madison Davenport, Chris Messina, Matt Craven, and Taylor John Smith had been cast in series regular roles. It was also announced that Will Chase, Jackson Hurst, and Jennifer Aspen had joined the cast in a recurring capacity. On May 22, 2017, it was announced that David Sullivan, Reagan Pasternak, Sydney Sweeney, Hilary Ward, and Sophia Lillis had been cast in recurring roles.

Filming
Principal photography for the series commenced on March 6, 2017. Filming locations included Barnesville, Georgia; Los Angeles, California; Redwood Valley, California; Santa Clarita, California; and Mendocino, California.

It was reported that there was a fair amount of turmoil on the set of the series. Showrunner Noxon described the alleged "toe-to-toe screaming matches" she and the other producers would get into with director Vallée over his refusal to adhere closely to the series' scripts. Noxon has described Vallée as "much more interested in imagery and telling stories through pictures, and he's brilliant at that...but I love language...I studied theatre at Wesleyan before I became a writer, and the beauty of language, particularly in the Southern Gothic tradition, is so important to me." Noxon together with Gillian Flynn, Jessica Rhoades, Amy Adams, and another (male) producer would reportedly have to pressure Vallée to include the dialogue of the script in his scenes, to his displeasure.

Music
Each episode features a title sequence with a different interpretation of the song "Dance and Angela" by Franz Waxman from the score of the 1951 film A Place in the Sun. An electronic treatment of the song, by Jeffrey Brodsky, was used for the second episode. All music featured in the series is diegetic, coming from a source (a stereo, headphones, etc) within the scene. The series secured the rights to four songs by Led Zeppelin, a band which is notoriously hard to get the rights for. Music supervisor Susan Jacobs stated, "We were trying to explain the importance of what music really does and how it plays a really pivotal role in this girl's life" and "also the escapism idea of music." The band liked the idea and approved the usage of their music.

Release

Marketing
On April 22, 2018, a teaser trailer for the series was released. On June 5, 2018, the official trailer was released.

Premiere
On June 7, 2018, the series held its world premiere during the opening night screening at the annual ATX Television Festival in Austin, Texas. Following the premiere, a question-and-answer panel took place featuring Amy Adams, Marti Noxon, Gillian Flynn, Jean-Marc Vallée, and Jason Blum.

Home media
Sharp Objects was released on Blu-ray and DVD on November 27, 2018.

Reception

Critical response
Sharp Objects received critical acclaim. On review aggregator Rotten Tomatoes, the series has an approval rating of 92% based on 289 reviews, with an average rating of 8.15/10. The website's critics consensus reads: "A nearly unbearable slow burn, Sharp Objects maintains its grip with an unshakably grim atmosphere and an outstanding cast led by a superb Amy Adams." On Metacritic, it has a weighted average score of 78 out of 100, based on 41 critics, indicating "generally favorable reviews".

In a positive review, the Chicago Sun Timess Richard Roeper awarded the series four stars and praised it saying, "Graced with some of the best performances Amy Adams and Patricia Clarkson have ever given, directed with sure-handed and sometimes flamboyant style by Jean-Marc Vallee and dripping with honey-coated but often barbed dialogue, Sharp Objects is flat-out great television. In another encouraging criticism, The Hollywood Reporters Daniel Fienberg was similarly complimentary saying, "On TV, Sharp Objects can't precisely capture Flynn's prose and the internalized descent into disorientation taken page-by-page, but series director Jean-Marc Vallee finds his own visual language that, driven by a ferociously wounded performance by Amy Adams, makes this eight-hour limited series haunting and riveting — both prestige and pulp." In a further approving editorial, The New York Timess James Poniewozik described the series as "mesmerizing" and commended it saying, "There's no cat-and-mouse game going on, no taunts from a genius criminal. Sharp Objects instead relies on internal drama and a transfixing Ms. Adams, who lays Camille’s ragged soul bare with sardonicism and self-loathing."

In a more mixed assessment, USA Todays Kelly Lawler gave the series a rating of two stars out of four and said, "Although the eight-episode series eventually perks up, in the seven parts made available for review it's often a lazy, dreary summer mystery that feels exploitative of the violence it depicts. It's a disappointing adaptation of its source material, with all the gravitas of a trashy beach read." In a further ambivalent editorial, TVLines Dave Nemetz gave the series a "B−" grade and said, "There's enough intriguing material in Sharp Objects to keep me watching until the end; at the very least, it’s still an artfully shot showcase for some fine acting, which isn’t the worst thing in the world. But considering the big names involved and the promising source material, it can’t help but feel like a letdown."

Ratings

Awards and nominations

Notes

References

External links
 
 
 
 

2010s American drama television miniseries
2010s American mystery television series
2018 American television series debuts
2018 American television series endings
American thriller television series
English-language television shows
Filicide in fiction
HBO original programming
Murder in television
Nonlinear narrative television series
Psychological thriller television series
Self-harm in fiction
Television series about journalism
Television series by Home Box Office
Television series by Entertainment One
Television series created by Marti Noxon
Television shows based on American novels
Television shows filmed in Georgia (U.S. state)
Television shows filmed in Los Angeles
Television shows filmed in Santa Clarita, California
Television shows set in Missouri